Nainital–Udhamsingh Nagar Lok Sabha constituency is one of the five Lok Sabha (parliamentary) constituencies in Uttarakhand. It comprises two districts namely Nainital (part) and Udham Singh Nagar. This constituency came into existence in 2009, following the delimitation of Lok Sabha constituencies.

Assembly segments
Nainital–Udhamsingh Nagar Lok Sabha constituency comprises the following fourteen Vidhan Sabha (legislative assembly) constituency segments:

Members of Parliament

Election results

General Election 2019

General Election 2014

General Election 2009

See also
 Nainital (Lok Sabha constituency)
 List of constituencies of the Lok Sabha
 List of parliamentary constituencies in Uttarakhand

References

External links
Nainital Udhamsingh Nagar lok sabha  constituency election 2019 date and schedule

Lok Sabha constituencies in Uttarakhand